Michael McKiernan is a former professional rugby league footballer who played in the 1980s. He was part of the inaugural Newcastle Knights squad from 1988-89.

Background
McKiernan played with Lakes United before signing with Newcastle in 1988.

Playing career
McKiernan made his first grade debut for Newcastle in Round 1 1988 against Parramatta which ended in a 28-4 defeat.  McKiernan scored his one and only try for Newcastle against Brisbane in Round 6 1988.  McKiernan played on with Newcastle in 1989 and his final game in first grade was a 20-2 loss against Western Suburbs at Campbelltown Stadium in Round 16 1989.

References

Australian rugby league players
Newcastle Knights players
Living people
Rugby league second-rows
Rugby league locks
1963 births
Place of birth missing (living people)